"Army" is a song by English singer Ellie Goulding from her third studio album, Delirium (2015). The song was serviced to contemporary hit radio in the United States on 19 April 2016 as the album's third single in North America, and second overall on 15 January 2016.

Composition
"Army" is written in the key of B major with a tempo of 87 beats per minute. Goulding's vocals span from B3 to B4. The song was written about Goulding's best and closest friend, Hannah.

Music video
The music video for "Army" was directed by Conor McDonnell and premiered on 14 January 2016. Shot in black and white, the video features Goulding having fun with friends in several settings, as well as performing the song live.

Track listings

Credits and personnel
Credits adapted from the liner notes of Delirium.

Recording
 Recorded at MXM Studios (Los Angeles, California) and Wolf Cousins Studios (Stockholm, Sweden)
 Vocals recorded at Studio at the Palms (Las Vegas, Nevada)
 Mixed at MixStar Studios (Virginia Beach, Virginia)
 Mastered at Sterling Sound (New York City, New York)

Personnel

 Ellie Goulding – vocals
 Max Martin – production, programming, backing vocals
 Ali Payami – production, guitars, programming, backing vocals
 Sam Holland – engineering, backing vocals
 Rob Katz – engineering
 Cory Bice – engineering assistance, backing vocals
 Jeremy Lertola – engineering assistance, backing vocals
 Kristian Lundin – additional vocals recording
 Savan Kotecha – backing vocals
 Doris Sandberg – backing vocals
 Jenny Schwartz – backing vocals
 Peter Carlsson – backing vocals
 Silke Lorenzen – backing vocals
 Rickard Göransson – backing vocals
 Serban Ghenea – mixing
 John Hanes – engineering for mix
 Tom Coyne – mastering
 Randy Merrill – mastering assistance

Charts

Certifications

Release history

Notes

References

2010s ballads
2015 songs
2016 singles
Black-and-white music videos
Ellie Goulding songs
Polydor Records singles
Pop ballads
Song recordings produced by Max Martin
Song recordings produced by Savan Kotecha
Songs about friendship
Songs written by Ali Payami
Songs written by Ellie Goulding
Songs written by Max Martin
Songs written by Savan Kotecha